Han Lili (韩丽丽,born 10 June 1990) is a Chinese woman cricketer who represents China women's national cricket team in domestic and international cricket in Women's Twenty20 cricket. She made her international cricket debut in 2018 when Chinese women's team toured South Korea.

A right-handed batsman with legbreak bowling style, she was also a part of China Women vs Kuwait Women in Women's Twenty20 International format held in 2019 in Bangkok. She played her last match in September 2019 during WT20I's tournament between China Women and HKG Women organised at Yeonhui Cricket Ground.

Career 
She played in 2012 Women's Twenty20 Asia Cup and subsequently participated in 2014 Asian Games Women's cricket competition. While representing China, she was also a part of 2017 Women's Twenty20 East Asia Cup.

References 

1990 births
Living people
Chinese women cricketers
Cricketers at the 2014 Asian Games
Asian Games competitors for China
China women Twenty20 International cricketers
21st-century Chinese women